The Women's 50 metre butterfly competition of the swimming events at the 2015 World Aquatics Championships was held on 7 August with the heats and the semifinals and 8 August with the final.

Records
Prior to the competition, the existing world and championship records were as follows.

The following new records were set during this competition.

Results

Heats
The heats were held at 09:54

Semifinals
The semifinals were held at 18:45.

Semifinal 1

Semifinal 2

Final
The final was held on 8 August at 17:32.

References

Women's 50 metre butterfly
Women's 50 metre butterfly
2015 in women's swimming